The Spectrum Awards were established in 1994 by Cathy Fenner and Arnie Fenner to recognize the best in fantasy, science fiction, and horror artwork created each year.

Spectrum Award categories
 Grand Master
 Advertising
 Book
 Comics
 Concept Art
 Dimensional
 Editorial
 Institutional 
 Unpublished

Spectrum Fantastic Art Live (SFAL) 
The Spectrum Awards are presented annually during an evening event held in conjunction with Spectrum Fantastic Art Live.

References

External links
 
 http://www.spectrumfantasticartlive.com
 list of books at official website
 
 Spectrum 12 Awards, Science Fiction and Fantasy Writers of America

 
Visual arts awards
Science fiction awards
Fantasy awards
Lists of speculative fiction-related award winners and nominees
Awards established in 1994